Sydbank A/S is one of Denmark's largest full service banks headquartered in Aabenraa. Sydbank was founded in 1970 with the merger of four local banks based in Southern Jutland: Den Nordslesvigske Folkebank (Aabenraa); Graasten Bank (Gråsten); Folkebanken for Als og Sundeved (Sønderborg) and Tønder Landmandsbank (Tønder). It has since then grown considerably through mergers and acquisitions, one of the latest being DiskontoBanken (DiBa Bank) of Næstved, which was delisted on the Copenhagen stock exchange as of 15 January 2014.

History

1970s 

Through the early 1970s, Sydbank had only 50 branches — all in south Jutland — until 1976 when it opened its first branch across the Kongeå River in Fredericia.

1980s 

In 1980, Sydbank grew greatly. In 1983, Sydbank opened an office at Kongens Nytorv in Copenhagen and merged with the Aarhus Bank.  In 1984, it engaged in another merger with Fuen Bank and Co-established bank with a branch in Flensburg and subsidiary SBK-Finance. In 1985, came a branch in Hamburg. 
In 1987, the company created Sydbank Investment branch Sydinvest and purchased parts of Copenhagen-based 6th July Bank, which had gone into receivership in March of that year. In 1988, it purchased Sydbank Community Bank branches in Copenhagen and the following year, bought Sydbank DMK-Holding.  The bank ended the decade with a market share of just two percent, 70 branches and 1,400 employees.

1990s 
Sydbank merged in 1990 with Sparekassen South Jutland. It acquired Varde Bank in early 1994, including 30 West Jutland departments. In May 1994, it bought Sydbank Active Bank and 40 East Jutland offices from Topdanmark.

2000s 
Since 2000, Sydbank has offices in almost all parts of Denmark.  Sydbank acquired Odense Bank Egnsbank Funen in 2002 and began to open branches in central Jutland and Sealand.  It opened the subsidiary Sydbank (Schweiz) AG in St. Gallen, Switzerland in 2002. In 2007, it sold Sydbank DMK-Holding to Ebh Bank and opened offices in Kiel. In 2008, the company purchased Trelleborg Bank, headquartered in Slagelse.

2010s 
Sydbank is now one of Denmark's largest full-service banks based in Southern Jutland and headquartered in Aabenraa. The Bank has a market share in the sector around seven percent, approximately 2,600 employees and 115 branches - including three in Germany. The Executive Director since 2010 is Karen Frøsig.

On September 17, 2019, half of Sydbank's board members (excl. employee-elected members) resigned in protest over Sydbank's strategy and governance. Several media report that the resignations follow failed attempts to merge Sydbank to improve profitability and falling stock.

2020s 

In October 2020, the bank acquired Alm. Brand Bank from Alm. Brand for €250 million.

SydbankFonden 
Sydbank founded SydbankFonden in 2002 which annually awards millions of dollars to charitable, cultural and popular applications.  Among others, SydbankFonden funded the bronze sculpture "Myth" in 2008 which was awarded to Sønderborg - inspired by King Christian II, who, according to the legend, created a groove in a stone board during captivity in Sønderborg-castle Castle.

References

External links 

 

Banks of Denmark
Companies based in Aabenraa Municipality
Danish companies established in 1970